The Admiralty  cicadabird or Manus  cicadabird (Edolisoma admiralitatis) is a species of bird in the family Campephagidae.  It is endemic to the Admiralty Islands. It was previously considered conspecific with the common cicadabird.

Its natural habitat is subtropical or tropical moist lowland forest.

References

Admiralty cicadabird
Admiralty cicadabird